Le Versoud is a commune in the Isère department in the Auvergne-Rhône-Alpes region in southeastern France. It is part of the Grenoble urban unit (agglomeration).

Population

See also
 Grenoble - Le Versoud Aerodrome

References

Communes of Isère
Isère communes articles needing translation from French Wikipedia